Cobitis calderoni is a species of ray-finned fish in the family Cobitidae.
It is found in Portugal and Spain.
Its natural habitat is rivers.
It is threatened by habitat loss.

References

Cobitis
Endemic fish of the Iberian Peninsula
Fish described in 1962
Taxonomy articles created by Polbot